Greenberg v. Miami Children's Hospital Research Institute, 264 F. Supp. 2d 1064 (S.D. Fla. 2003), was a decision by the United States District Court for the Southern District of Florida which ruled that individuals do not own their tissue samples when researchers take them for testing.

History
The plaintiffs in this case were a group of parents of children who had Canavan disease and three non-profit organizations who developed a confidential Canavan disease registry and database.  The parents provided their children's tissue for research on the disease and the non-profit groups aided in the identification of other affected families.  The defendant was Reuben Matalon, who received these tissue samples and used them to isolate and patent the Canavan gene sequence.  He subsequently developed a genetic screening test for it and began claiming royalties whenever the test was used. The Miami facilities where he did his research, including Miami Children's Hospital, were also defendants.

Decision
The court dismissed the plaintiffs' claims that the defendants did not provide informed consent, conducted a breach of fiduciary duties, concealed the patent, and misappropriated trade secrets. The court did uphold the plaintiffs' claim of unjust enrichment at the expense of the donors of tissue, writing that "the facts paint a picture of a continuing research collaboration that involved plaintiffs also investing time and significant resources."

Significance
The case set a precedent for determining ownership of donated tissue samples.

References

External links
 
Canavan Foundation's press release

2003 in Florida
2003 in United States case law
United States District Court for the Southern District of Florida cases
United States property case law
Bioethics